The Theban Tomb TT36 is located in El-Assasif, part of the Theban Necropolis, on the west bank of the Nile, opposite to Luxor. It is the burial place of the ancient Egyptian Ibi, who was "Chief Steward of the Adorer of the God" (Nitoqret I), during the reign of Psamtik I during the 26th dynasty.

Decoration and layout
The tomb decoration in this tomb was copied from the tomb of another noble called Ibi, from the Old Kingdom cemetery at Deir el-Gabrawi. This is typical of the Saite Period, which tended to echo the decoration of previous periods of Egyptian history.

The tomb is entered via a flight of steps that run parallel to the main axis. At the foot of these steps is an antechamber, which is decorated with scenes of Ibi adoring Ra-Horakhty. There is also a false door, echoing Old Kingdom decoration. A doorway leads from the middle of the right hand wall into what was a pillared hall (these pillars have since been destroyed). This room shows Ibi dressed as an ancient noble, watching the work of craftsmen and dancing girls.

The right-hand wall has a doorway that leads into what was once an open court. This is decorated on the right-hand wall with a hunting scene, and on the left-hand wall Ibi and his father sit whilst offerings are placed in tables in front of them. From this hall several chambers lead off, one to the burial-shaft. These chambers have Ptolemaic paintings, and show that the tomb was reused at this time.

See also
 List of Theban tombs

References

Theban tombs